The Creed of Jerusalem is a baptismal formula used by early Christians to confess their faith. Some authors (like Philip Schaff) believed that it was one of the sources of the Nicene-Constantinopolitan Creed, drawn up at the First Council of Constantinople in 381 and date it to 350 AD.

In the original form, given by Cyril of Jerusalem, it says:

References 

Christian statements of faith
Trinitarianism
Christian terminology
4th-century Christian texts